Alexsander Christian Gomes da Costa (born 8 October 2003), simply known as Alexsander, is a Brazilian footballer who currently plays as a midfielder for Fluminense.

Club career
Born in Rio de Janeiro, Alexsander was a Fluminense youth graduate. On 21 October 2021, he renewed his contract with the club until 2026.

Alexsander made his first team – and Série A – debut on 5 November 2022, coming on as a half-time substitute for Cris Silva in a 3–1 home win over São Paulo.

Career statistics

References

2003 births
Living people
Footballers from Rio de Janeiro (city)
Brazilian footballers
Association football midfielders
Campeonato Brasileiro Série A players
Fluminense FC players